During the 2011–12 season, Accrington Stanley F.C. competed in League Two. This was their 6th season in the Football League and 14th was their second highest position.

It was a year of transition for Stanley with long serving manager John Coleman and his assistant Jimmy Bell leaving the club to join League One side Rochdale. Former player Paul Cook was appointed the new manager with his assistant being Leam Richardson, who was caretaker manager in the intervening spell.

The end of the season saw chairman Ilyas Khan step down. He said he had been racially abused since taking over the club in March 2011.

Stanley also made the news in October 2011, when on-loan defender Tom Bender was knocked out in a collision with team mate Ian Dunbavin and Tranmere Rovers striker Lucas Akins in a Football League Trophy tie. Consequently, the game was abandoned with Tranmere leading 2–1. Bender was treated for 30 minutes on the pitch before being taken to hospital where he regained consciousness and made a full recovery.

League table

Squad statistics

Appearances and goals

|}

Top scorers

Disciplinary record

Results

Pre-Season Friendlies

League Two

FA Cup

League Cup

Football League Trophy

Transfers

References 

2011–12
2011–12 Football League Two by team